Li Shongjian (born 29 January 1939) is a Chinese chess player. He was a member of the Chinese national chess team. He was part of the national team at the Chess Olympiad in 1980 as second reserve. This was the second time China competed in this event. This was his only appearance.

China Chess League
Li Shongjian played for Sichuan chess club in the Second Division of the China Chess League (CCL).

See also
Chess in China

References

External links

1939 births
Living people
Chinese chess players